Antireligious campaigns in China refer to the Chinese Communist Party's official promotion of state atheism, coupled with its persecution of people with spiritual or religious beliefs, in the People's Republic of China. Antireligious campaigns were launched in 1949, after the Chinese Communist Revolution, and they continue to be waged against Buddhists, Christians, Muslims, and members of other religious communities in the 21st century. State campaigns against religion have escalated since Xi Jinping became General Secretary of the Chinese Communist Party on November 15, 2012. For Christians, government decrees have mandated the widespread removal of crosses from churches, and in some cases, they have also mandated the destruction of houses of worship, such as the Catholic Three Rivers Church in the city of Wenzhou. In Tibet, similar decrees have mandated the destruction of Tibetan Buddhist monastic centers, the destruction of sacred Buddhist sites, the destruction of monastic residences, the denial of the Tibetan people's right to freely access their cultural heritage, the ongoing persecution of high Buddhist lamas and the ongoing persecution of Buddhist nuns and monks. Reports which document the existence of forced re-education camps, arrests, beatings, rape, and the destruction of religious sites in Tibet are also being published with regard to the Uyghur people, who are being subjected to an ongoing genocide.

Cultural Revolution 
As a result of anti-religious campaigns which were waged between 1950 and 1979, all churches, mosques, and temples were closed and re-education was imposed upon clergy. In Tibet, monasteries were demolished and monks and nuns were arrested or killed.

During the Cultural Revolution, the possession of religious texts was also criminalized. Monks were beaten or killed, and many Tibetans escaped with sacred texts and compiled teachings in exile communities in India.

1989–2002: Jiang Zemin administration 
The Chinese government and the Communist Party, led by Jiang Zemin from 1989 to 2002, commenced the persecution of Falun Gong; it called for the "education of Marxist materialism and atheism" to counter Falun Gong.

Tibetan Buddhists 

In 1989, violent repression spread in Tibet after prolonged rebellions against Chinese rule. Under the local authority of Hu Jintao, then CCP Secretary of Tibet, possibly hundreds of Tibetans were killed. Martial Law was declared for a year until 30 April 1990, during which hundreds more were killed and thousands imprisoned, under Jiang's Beijing authority and Hu's local authority. Hu was later promoted to top leadership posts for his work.

In 1991, while crafting policy towards Tibetan Buddhists, Jiang's preliminary decree stated reincarnated lamas must be approved by China's central government. The decree was later revised and termed State Religious Affairs Bureau Order No. 5 in 2007 during the administration of Hu Jintao.

In 1992, Jiang's government formally accepted the 14th Dalai Lama's official recognition and the enthronement of Orgyen Trinley Dorje as the reincarnated 17th Gyalwang Karmapa, spiritual leader of the Karma Kagyu school. The recognition process was led by the 3rd Jamgon Kongtrul who died in a mysterious car crash earlier in 1992. The Karmapa, along with the Dalai Lama and the Panchen Lama, are highly respected by Tibetans and considered to be living Buddhas. By 1999, the Karmapa escaped to India, afterwards pointing to interference by the Chinese government in his spiritual leadership and studies as his motive.

Also in 1992, 13 monks from Drepung Monastery were arrested on 12 May for protesting peacefully. Samdup was jailed for seven years, and in 2020 became the fourth former political prisoner to die from medical complications within the previous six months.

In 1994, a Chinese policy called "grasping with both hands" was implemented in Tibet, targeting Tibetan Buddhism and culture. It was credited with leading to the 2008 Tibetan unrest.

On 17 May 1995, Jiang's government officially reversed its acceptance policy of recognized re-incarnated lamas and of Tibetan Buddhist spiritual leaders, and abducted Gedhun Choekyi Nyima, the 11th Panchen Lama, three days after his official recognition by the Dalai Lama. Chadrel Rinpoche and two others involved in the recognition process were also disappeared, then imprisoned. Months later in November, Jiang's government installed its proxy Panchen Lama, Gyaltsen Norbu. The recognized 11th Panchen Lama Gedhun Choekyi Nyima continues to be forcibly detained in an unknown location.

In 1996, Jiang's administration officially banned all photographs of Tibet's spiritual leader the 14th Dalai Lama.

By March 1998, the Central Tibetan Administration reported the Dalai Lama statement that Chinese campaigns of repression have travelled beyond monasteries and nunneries, and that Jiang was undertaking "a deliberate policy of cultural genocide in Tibet".

In 2001, the Chinese government began persecuting and forcibly evicting nuns and monks studying at Larung Gar Buddhist Academy and at Yarchen Gar in Tibet.

2002–2012: Hu Jintao administration 
Under the Chinese government and the Communist Party, led by Hu Jintao from 2002 to 2012, land redevelopment was used as a form of religious persecution, while the demolition of spiritually sacred buildings and sites was undertaken.

Tibetan Buddhists 
In 2006, Tibetans were arrested after responding to calls from the Dalai Lama to burn animal skin clothing. Bonfires spread throughout Tibet as a form of defiance.

The persecution of Tibetan Buddhists escalated under Hu Jintao, leading to the 2008 Tibetan unrest. The uprising is described as the biggest challenge to China's invasion since 1959. As unrest over Chinese persecution grew, waves of protests began, including street demonstrations which were met with excessive force. A mass arrest of 280 monks at the Labrang Monastery was reported during this time, as was torture during confinement. 

A farming boycott began in 2009 in protest for those people detained or "disappeared" into Chinese custody. Civil disobedience became widespread, as all the monks in a Jomda, Chamdo province monastery deserted in June 2009 instead of participating in "patriotic education".

On 13 July 2007, the State Religious Affairs Bureau Order No. 5 was passed, requiring reincarnated lamas and religious institutions in Tibet to apply for permission with People's Republic of China's bureaus so as be legal. 

Acts of self-immolation began in 2009 at Kirti Monastery. In 2010, two Tibetan laypeople were killed while trying to stop a mass arrest of approximately 300 monks at Kirti Monastery.

In 2011, China's foreign ministry announced only Beijing could appoint the 15th Dalai Lama. A monk at Nyitso monastery, Tsewang Norbu, self immolated after chanting "Long live the Dalai Lama" and "Tibetan people want freedom". The non-profit organization Free Tibet said telephone and internet services were subsequently cut to keep the news from spreading, and the monastery's utilities had been repeatedly cut. Author Tsering Woeser said Chinese security forces surrounded the monastery the same night of Tsewang Norbu's death.

2012–present: Xi Jinping administration 
The Chinese government and Chinese Communist Party led by Xi Jinping from 2012–present intensified antireligious campaigns in the country. In 2016, Xi called for "improved religious work" by uniting religious and non-religious people, and emphasizing that members of the Chinese Communist Party must act as "unyielding Marxist atheists".

In September 2019, the UN Human Rights Council was told by the China Tribunal that the Government of China "is harvesting and selling organs from persecuted religious and ethnic minorities on an industrial scale". The tribunal concluded that religious and ethnic minorities are being “killed to order... cut open while still alive for their kidneys, livers, hearts, lungs, cornea and skin to be removed and turned into commodities for sale”.

Tibetan Buddhists 

According to a report by the Tibetan Centre for Human Rights and Democracy, under Xi Jinping, the widespread targeting of Tibetans and of Tibetan Buddhist monasteries, together with the persecution of ordained Khenpos, nuns and monks escalated. Han Chinese settling in Tibet also continues.

Massive redevelopment projects including railways, mines, roadways, dams and shopping centers forcibly displace Tibetans and erode the environment. From 2015 to present, farmlands and ancestral nomadic grazing lands are also being confiscated from Tibetans.

Reports state that administrators of monasteries have been replaced by police or by people considered government infiltrators, while military surveillance units have been installed at Kirti Monastery, Yarchen Gar, Shak Rongpo Gaden Dargyeling Monastery, and at other monasteries, along with CCTV cameras. Drongna Monastery was forcibly closed in 2013, and its chant master Thardhod Gyaltsen received an 18-year prison sentence in 2014 for possession of a picture and recording of the 14th Dalai Lama.

Some also express concerns that construction and tourism are eroding Tibetan culture. By 2020, after Chinese state-sponsored tourist agencies funneled people from inner China to Lhasa, reports state the tourists disrupt ceremonies, are disrespectful to Tibetan customs, and throw trash around sacred sites. Police support the tourists confronted by complaints.

Reports also indicate tourism is used to disrupt monastic life within Buddhist monasteries. Monastic residences of nuns and monks were demolished before mass evictions began in 2016 at Larung Gar, in 2019 at Yarchen Gar, in 2013 at Jhada Gon Palden Khachoe Nunnery, and elsewhere. Reports indicate that nuns and nunneries are targeted for demolition more often than those of monks. Tourist accommodations and roads replaced the residences, or are planned for the sites where residences were demolished. Other monasteries are partially renovated for tourist accommodations whose proximity disrupts daily life.

After the mass evictions, nuns and monks were bused away, and reportedly detained in reeducation centers. Among others, an identified reeducation center is named Ningtri. Reports include beatings and the torture of monastics and of laypeople at reeducation centers, and in jails after arrests.

In 2016, the CCP commenced a campaign to sinicize religion, which intensified after 2018. The Sinicization of Tibet was condemned by the Dalai Lama as cultural cleansing.

The ethnic cleansing policies in Tibet were managed by hardliner Chen Quanguo, before his 2016 transfer to govern Xinjiang. A United States Department of State report in 2019 documented incidents of sexual abuse, rape, and gender-based violence at the Chinese detention centers.

In April 2019, the Chinese police-enforced ban against photographs of the Dalai Lama spread to remote areas of Tibet.

Christians 

The persecution of members of other spiritual organizations is also continuing under Xi Jinping. Journalist Ian Johnson noted that officials have targeted Christianity, and Islam, with particular intensity because of their perceived foreign ties. In the Chinese province of Zhejiang alone, over 1200 Christian crosses have been removed from their steeples since 2013.

In August 2017 in the Shanxi province a number of Catholic priests and supporters were injured while preventing a government-owned bulldozer from demolishing a church owned property—an old factory building allocated to the Church as restitution for a church-owned property destroyed in 1992. Local authorities unanimously decided the condition of the property met the criteria for demolishment as required by the city's planned transportation network project. However the diocese complained they were denied an opportunity to negotiate, and were given no assurance of fair compensation. In February 2018, government authorities in Kashgar, "launched an anti-religion propaganda drive through local police stations", which included policemen erecting a banner proclaiming “We Must Solemnly Reject Religion, Must Not Believe in Religion”.

In December 2018, Chinese officials raided Christian house churches just prior to Christmas and coerced their owners to close them down; Christmas trees and Santa Clauses were also forcibly removed. In 2018, the United Front Work Department initiated a crackdown on large outdoor religious statues.

The government of China continued to persecute Christians during the 2019 COVID-19 pandemic, demolishing the Xiangbaishu Church in Yixing and removing a Christian Cross from the steeple of a church in Guiyang County. In the Shandong Province, "officials issued guidance forbidding online preaching, a vital way for churches to reach congregants amid both persecution and the spread of the virus".

In 2020, the Chinese government put additional regulations in place to restrict religious education and proselytizing.

Muslims 

By November 2018, the Chinese government had detained over one million Uyghurs in what it refers to as "training centers" as part of a thought reform campaign, "where Uyghur Muslims are remade into atheist Chinese subjects". For children forcibly taken away from their parents, the Chinese government has established kindergartens with the aim of combating 'three evil forces' (separatism, extremism and terrorism), and "converting future generations of Uyghur Muslim children into loyal subjects who embrace atheism". According to estimates from the Australian Strategic Policy Institute, that under Xi Jinping, thousands of mosques and Muslim religious sites were damaged or destroyed in China. Government campaigns against Islam have extended to the Hui people and Utsul community in Hainan.

Chinese officials did not acknowledge the existence of any sort of detention camps. The Chinese government states that Uyghurs are being sent to vocational training centers in order to prevent the spread of extremism and to increase their employability. In November 2019, the detention centers were described in the leaked Xinjiang papers.

Jews 
The Kaifeng Jewish community has reported increasing suppression by the authorities since 2015, reversing the modest revival it experienced in the 1990s. The observance of public religious services and the celebration of religious festivals like Passover and Sukkot have been prohibited, and Jewish community groups have been shut down. Signs have been removed from the Kaifeng Synagogue, a historical site located on Teaching the Torah Lane that is now under strict surveillance.

Responses 
In December 2020, the Tibet Policy and Support Act became law in the United States in support of Tibetan Buddhists' right to determine Dalai Lama succession.

See also 

Human rights in China
Islamophobia in China
Racism in China
Freedom of religion in China
Penal system in China
Xinjiang internment camps
Organ harvesting from Falun Gong practitioners in China
Persecution of Falun Gong

References

External links 
United States Commission on International Religious Freedom - China reports

Campaigns of the Chinese Communist Party
Falun Gong
Religion in China
Torture in China
Religious persecution by communists
Persecution of Christians
Persecution of Muslims
Persecution of Buddhists
Persecution by atheist states
Human rights abuses in China
Crime in China
Racism in China
Criticism of religion
Communist repression